The UAAP Season 78 basketball tournaments are held in school year 2015-16. University of the Philippines Diliman is the season host. The basketball tournaments started with a doubleheader basketball games after the opening ceremonies on September 5, 2015,  at the Smart Araneta Coliseum and ended on December 2, 2015, at the Mall of Asia Arena, while the junior's basketball has currently been held since November. ABS-CBN's UHF channel ABS-CBN Sports and Action broadcast the men's tournament for the sixteenth consecutive year.

Men's tournament

Teams

Elimination round

Team standings

Match-up results

Scores

Bracket

Semifinals
In the semifinals, the higher seed has the twice-to-beat advantage, where they only have to win once, while their opponents twice, to progress.

UST vs. NU
The UST Growling Tigers  had the twice-to-beat advantage.

FEU vs. Ateneo
The FEU Tamaraws had the twice-to-beat advantage.

Finals
This is the first Finals matchup between the FEU Tamaraws and the UST Growling Tigers in 36 years. The last time these two teams faced each other in the Finals was in UAAP Season 42.

 Finals Most Valuable Player:

Broadcast notes 

ABS-CBN Sports is the official broadcaster of the UAAP Season 78 Men's Basketball Finals. Simulcast over ABS-CBN Channel 2 and ABS-CBN HD Channel 167 (Game 2 only), ABS-CBN Sports and Action,  Balls HD channel 195, The Filipino Channel. Livestream over TFC.tv, sports.abs-cbn.com and IWant TV. Replays on Balls. This is the first time in the finals of the game 2 series to broadcast in both ABS-CBN Channel 2 and ABS-CBN Sports and Action.

Additional Game 2 crew:
 Awards Presenter: Nikko Ramos

Additional Game 3 crew:
 Awards Presenter: TJ Manotoc

Awards

 Most Valuable Player: 
 Rookie of the Year: 
 Mythical Team:

Sponsored awards
 Bear Brand Adult Plus Level Up Player: 
 Jolibee Beeda ang Galing Player: 
 Master Gwapo Player: 
 Appeton Most Improved Player: 
 PS Bank PSBankable Player: 
 Team Bonchon of the Year:

Coaching changes and suspensions
Renzy Bajar was appointed as the new head coach of the UP Fighting Maroons in UAAP Season 78.
Mike Fermin was appointed as the new head coach of the Adamson Falcons in UAAP Season 78. He only spent for one season. He was replaced by former La Salle coach Franz Pumaren.
Mike Fermin of the Adamson Falcons was suspended on their game against the NU Bulldogs, last September 23, after he was ejected during their game against La Salle due to a slit-throat gesture.
 Bo Perasol announced that UAAP Season 78 will be his final year as head coach of the Ateneo Blue Eagles. He was replaced by Philippines men's national basketball team coach Tab Baldwin.
 Juno Sauler resigned as the head coach of the De La Salle Green Archers after they miss the Final Four this season. He was replaced by Letran coach Aldin Ayo.

Women's tournament

Elimination round

Team standings

Match-up results

Scores

Fourth–seed playoff

Bracket

Stepladder semifinals

First round
This is a single-elimination game.

Second round
La Salle has the twice-to-beat advantage, where they only have to win once, while their opponents twice, to progress.

Finals
NU has to win two times, while their opponent has to win three times.

 Finals Most Valuable Player:

Awards

Most Valuable Player: 
Rookie of the Year: 
Mythical Team:

Juniors' tournament

Elimination round

Team standings

Match-up results

Scores

Bracket

Stepladder semifinals

First round

Second round
In the semifinals, La Salle has the twice-to-beat advantage, where they only have to win once, while their opponents twice, to progress.

Finals
NU has to win two times, while their opponent has to win three times. The finals series will be aired on ABS-CBN Sports and Action Channel 23 and HD Channel 166.

Finals Most Valuable Player:

Awards

Most Valuable Player: 
Rookie of the Year: 
Mythical Five:

Overall Championship points

Seniors' division

In case of a tie, the team with the higher position in any tournament is ranked higher. If both are still tied, they are listed by alphabetical order.

How rankings are determined:
 Ranks 5th to 8th determined by elimination round standings.
 Loser of the #1 vs #4 semifinal match-up is ranked 4th
 Loser of the #2 vs #3 semifinal match-up is ranked 3rd
 Loser of the finals is ranked 2nd
 Champion is ranked 1st

See also
NCAA Season 91 basketball tournaments

References

78
2015–16 in Philippine college basketball
Basket